Vladan Gjurica (d. April 1465) was an Albanian nobleman and Skanderbeg's main advisor during Skanderbeg's rebellion.  He is thought to be from Gjoricë, in modern-day Dibër County from which he got the surname Gjurica/Jurica. He was most likely a member of the Arianiti family. During the Battle of Vaikal he was captured  and sent to Constantinople where he was skinned alive.

References
Notes

  
Sources

Sources

15th-century Albanian people
Medieval Albanian nobility
Albanian military personnel
Year of birth unknown
1465 deaths
People executed by flaying
15th-century executions by the Ottoman Empire
Albanian people executed abroad
People from Bulqizë